Mount Pleasant is a nearly extinct unincorporated town in Bethlehem Township, Cass County, Indiana.

History
Mount Pleasant was laid out in 1836.

Geography
Indiana State Road 25 passes northeast through town.

References

Unincorporated communities in Cass County, Indiana
Unincorporated communities in Indiana